The following outline is provided as an overview of and topical guide to Paraguay:

Paraguay – one of the two landlocked countries in South America.  (The other is Bolivia.)  Paraguay lies on both banks of the Paraguay River, bordering Argentina to the south and southwest, Brazil to the east and northeast, and Bolivia to the northwest, and is located in the center of South America, the country is sometimes referred to as Corazón de América - Heart of (South) AmericaLa historia del Paraguay along with BoliviaSouth America's New Hero: Indian, Coca Farmer, Bolivian President - International - SPIEGEL ONLINE - News and Brazil

 General reference 

 Pronunciation:
 Common English country name:  Paraguay
 Official English country name:  The Republic of Paraguay
 Common endonym(s):  
 Official endonym(s):  
 Adjectival(s): Paraguayan
 Demonym(s):
 Etymology: Name of Paraguay
 International rankings of Paraguay
 ISO country codes:  PY, PRY, 600
 ISO region codes:  See ISO 3166-2:PY
 Internet country code top-level domain:  .py

 Geography of Paraguay 

Geography of Paraguay
 Paraguay is: a landlocked country
 Location:
 Southern Hemisphere
 Western Hemisphere
 Latin America
 South America
 Southern Cone (definition varies as to whether Paraguay is included or not)
 Time zone:  UTC-04, October–March UTC-03
 Extreme points of Paraguay
 High:  Cerro Peró 
 Low:  Rio Paraguay 
 Land boundaries:  3,995 km
 1,880 km
 1,365 km
 750 km
 Coastline:  none
 Population of Paraguay: 6,127,000  - 103rd most populous country

 Area of Paraguay: 406752 km2
 Atlas of Paraguay

 Environment of Paraguay 

Environment of Paraguay
 Climate of Paraguay
 Environmental issues in Paraguay
 Geology of Paraguay
 Protected areas of Paraguay
 National parks of Paraguay
 Wildlife of Paraguay
 Fauna of Paraguay
 Birds of Paraguay
 Mammals of Paraguay

 Natural geographic features of Paraguay 
 Islands of Paraguay
 Rivers of Paraguay
 World Heritage Sites in Paraguay

 Regions of Paraguay 

Regions of Paraguay

 Ecoregions of Paraguay 

List of ecoregions in Paraguay

 Administrative divisions of Paraguay 

Administrative divisions of Paraguay
 Departments of Paraguay
 Districts of Paraguay

 Provinces of Paraguay 

Departments of Paraguay

 Districts of Paraguay 

Districts of Paraguay

 Municipalities of Paraguay 

Municipalities of Paraguay
 Capital of Paraguay: Asunción
 Cities of Paraguay

 Demography of Paraguay 

Demographics of Paraguay

 Government and politics of Paraguay 

 Form of government:
 Capital of Paraguay: Asunción
 Elections in Paraguay
 Political parties in Paraguay

 Branches of the government of Paraguay 

Government of Paraguay

 Executive branch of the government of Paraguay 
 Head of state: President of Paraguay,
 Cabinet of Paraguay

 Legislative branch of the government of Paraguay 
 Parliament of Paraguay (bicameral)
 Upper house: Senate of Paraguay
 Lower house: House of Representatives of Paraguay

 Judicial branch of the government of Paraguay 

Court system of Paraguay
 Supreme Court of Paraguay

 Foreign relations of Paraguay 

Foreign relations of Paraguay
 Diplomatic missions in Paraguay
 Diplomatic missions of Paraguay

 International organization membership 
The Republic of Paraguay is a member of:

Agency for the Prohibition of Nuclear Weapons in Latin America and the Caribbean (OPANAL)
Andean Community of Nations (CAN) (associate)
Food and Agriculture Organization (FAO)
Group of 77 (G77)
Inter-American Development Bank (IADB)
International Atomic Energy Agency (IAEA)
International Bank for Reconstruction and Development (IBRD)
International Civil Aviation Organization (ICAO)
International Criminal Court (ICCt)
International Criminal Police Organization (Interpol)
International Development Association (IDA)
International Federation of Red Cross and Red Crescent Societies (IFRCS)
International Finance Corporation (IFC)
International Fund for Agricultural Development (IFAD)
International Labour Organization (ILO)
International Maritime Organization (IMO)
International Monetary Fund (IMF)
International Olympic Committee (IOC)
International Organization for Migration (IOM)
International Organization for Standardization (ISO) (correspondent)
International Red Cross and Red Crescent Movement (ICRM)
International Telecommunication Union (ITU)
International Telecommunications Satellite Organization (ITSO)
International Trade Union Confederation (ITUC)
Inter-Parliamentary Union (IPU)
Latin American Economic System (LAES)
Latin American Integration Association (LAIA)
Multilateral Investment Guarantee Agency (MIGA)

Nonaligned Movement (NAM) (observer)
Organisation for the Prohibition of Chemical Weapons (OPCW)
Organization of American States (OAS)
Permanent Court of Arbitration (PCA)
Rio Group (RG)
Southern Cone Common Market (Mercosur)
Unión Latina
Union of South American Nations (UNASUR)
United Nations (UN)
United Nations Conference on Trade and Development (UNCTAD)
United Nations Educational, Scientific, and Cultural Organization (UNESCO)
United Nations Industrial Development Organization (UNIDO)
United Nations Mission for the Referendum in Western Sahara (MINURSO)
United Nations Mission in Liberia (UNMIL)
United Nations Mission in the Sudan (UNMIS)
United Nations Operation in Côte d'Ivoire (UNOCI)
United Nations Organization Mission in the Democratic Republic of the Congo (MONUC)
United Nations Stabilization Mission in Haiti (MINUSTAH)
Universal Postal Union (UPU)
World Confederation of Labour (WCL)
World Customs Organization (WCO)
World Federation of Trade Unions (WFTU)
World Health Organization (WHO)
World Intellectual Property Organization (WIPO)
World Meteorological Organization (WMO)
World Tourism Organization (UNWTO)
World Trade Organization (WTO)

 Law and order in Paraguay 

Law of Paraguay
 Cannabis in Paraguay
 Constitution of Paraguay
 Crime in Paraguay
 Human rights in Paraguay
 LGBT rights in Paraguay
 Freedom of religion in Paraguay
 Law enforcement in Paraguay

 Military of Paraguay 

Military of Paraguay
 Command
 Commander-in-chief:
 Forces
 Army of Paraguay
 Navy of Paraguay: None
 Air Force of Paraguay
 Military ranks of paraguay

 Local government in Paraguay 

Local government in Paraguay

 History of Paraguay 

 Military history of ParaguayHistoric figures':
José Gaspar Rodríguez de Francia
Fulgencio Yegros
Pedro Juan Caballero
Carlos Antonio López
Francisco Solano López
Eliza Lynch
José Félix Estigarribia
Alfredo Stroessner
Augusto Roa Bastos

Culture of Paraguay 

Culture of Paraguay
 Architecture of Paraguay
 Cuisine of Paraguay
 Languages of Paraguay
 Media in Paraguay
 National symbols of Paraguay
 Coat of arms of Paraguay
 Flag of Paraguay
 National anthem of Paraguay
 Prostitution in Paraguay
 Public holidays in Paraguay
 Religion in Paraguay
 Christianity in Paraguay
 Hinduism in Paraguay
 Islam in Paraguay
 World Heritage Sites in Paraguay

Art in Paraguay 
 Art in Paraguay
Paraguayan Indian art
 Cinema of Paraguay
 Music of Paraguay
 Television in Paraguay

Sports in Paraguay 

Sports in Paraguay
 Football in Paraguay
 Paraguay at the Olympics

Economy and infrastructure of Paraguay 

Economy of Paraguay
 Economic rank, by nominal GDP (2007): 113th (one hundred and thirteenth)
 Agriculture in Paraguay
 Communications in Paraguay
 Internet in Paraguay
 Companies of Paraguay
Currency of Paraguay: Guaraní
ISO 4217: PYG
 Energy in Paraguay
 Health care in Paraguay
 Mining in Paraguay
 Tourism in Paraguay
 Transport in Paraguay
 Airports in Paraguay
 Rail transport in Paraguay
 Water supply and sanitation in Paraguay

Education in Paraguay 

Education in Paraguay
 List of high schools in Paraguay
 List of universities in Paraguay

Health in Paraguay 

Health in Paraguay
 List of hospitals in Paraguay

See also 
Paraguay
Index of Paraguay-related articles
List of Paraguay-related topics
List of international rankings
Member state of the United Nations
Outline of geography
Outline of South America

References

External links 

  National Department of Tourism
  Ministry of Finance with economic and Government information, available also in English
  Tourism in Paraguay
  Tourist and Hotel in Paraguay
 Encyclopædia Britannica Paraguay Complete guide to Paraguay's history and culture
 CIA - The World Factbook: Paraguay
 Paraguay Convention & Visitor's Bureau

 Newspapers
  ABC Color
  Última Hora
  La Nación

Paraguay
 1